Narcisse Henri Édouard Faucher (April 18, 1844 – April 1, 1897) was a Canadian author, journalist, army officer, and politician who published books under the name Faucher de Saint-Maurice.

Life
Faucher was born in Quebec. His father, Narcisse-Constantin Faucher, was a lawyer and the seigneur of Beaumont, Vincennes, and of Montapeine. His mother was Catherine-Henriette Marcier. He was educated at the Séminaire de Québec and at the Collège de Sainte-Anne-de-la-Pocatière.

In 1864, he joined the conflict in Mexico and became a captain in the 4th Mexican sharpshooters. Afterward, he was aide-de-camp to General the Viscount Courtois Roussel d'Hurbal. He served through the war, being in 11 battles, 32 minor engagements, and at the sieges of Oaxaca and Satillo; at the latter, he was made prisoner and sentenced to be shot, but was, instead, exchanged. While in Mexico, he met Honoré Beaugrand.

He returned to Canada in 1866, and was for the next fourteen years a clerk of the legislative council of the province of Quebec. In 1874 he began putting more effort into his writing. In 1881 he was elected a representative for Bellechasse to the Quebec legislative assembly as a Conservative; he was reelected in 1886 but defeated in 1890.

He was a commissioner in 1881 from the province of Quebec at the third Geographical Congress and Exhibition in Venice, and while in Europe was created a chevalier of the Legion of Honor for services rendered to France in the Canadian press. He also had been created a knight of the Imperial order of Guadaloupe by Maximilian, and received the medal of the Mexican campaign from Napoleon III.

He was editor of Le journal de Québec (1883-5) then wrote for Le Canadien (1885-6). He contributed largely to the newspaper press in France, Canada, and the United States.

He died at Quebec City at the age of 52.

Works
De Québec à Mexico (1874)
À la Brunante (1874)
Choses et autres (1874)
De Tribord à bâbord (1877)
À la Veillée (1877)
Deux ans au Mexique (1878)
Relation de ce qui s'est passé lors des fouilles faites par ordre du gouvernement dans une partie des fondations du Collège des jésuites de Québec (1879)
L'abbé C.-H. Laverdière.
Les Îles: Promenades dans le golfe Saint-Laurent (1886?)
En route; sept jours dans les provinces Maritimes (1888)
Loin du pays, souvenirs d'Europe, d'Afrique et d'Amérique (1889)
La question du jour: resterons-nous français? (1890)

Notes

References

External links

 
 
 

1844 births
1897 deaths
Canadian writers in French
Chevaliers of the Légion d'honneur
Conservative Party of Quebec MNAs
Politicians from Quebec City
Writers from Quebec City